Silkstone Common is a village in the metropolitan borough of Barnsley in South Yorkshire, England.

The village has Junior and Infants Schools, a railway station, a single local shop and the Station Inn.

One of the most notable events in the history of the village was the Huskar Pit Disaster, which occurred on 4 July 1838 when a freak storm flooded part of the mine, killing 26 children; the youngest was 7 years, the oldest 17. A historical account of this event has been documented in the book entitled Children of the Dark.

Notable buildings include Knabb's Hall which was built in late 17th century for William and Elizabeth Wood of Wortley Forge, and the Old Station House, a building located directly beside the railway line which once housed the railway owner but now functions as a residential building.

References

External links

Villages in South Yorkshire
Geography of the Metropolitan Borough of Barnsley